is a dam in Kawabe, Gifu Prefecture, Japan, completed in 1936.

References 

Dams in Gifu Prefecture
Dams completed in 1936